"Body Say" is a song by American singer Demi Lovato. She co-wrote the track with Simon Wilcox and its producer, Sir Nolan. It was initially released exclusively to music streaming services through Island, Hollywood and Safehouse Records on July 1, 2016, was serviced to pop radio on July 12, 2016, and was made available to iTunes on July 15, 2016.

Release
Lovato announced this song's release on June 29, 2016 through Twitter, writing that she only recorded the song "a couple weeks ago" but wanted to release it "right away" as a promotional single for her tour with Nick Jonas, the Future Now Tour. She teased the song on social media by posting nude and semi-nude, black-and-white photos from the single cover's photo shoot on Instagram accompanied by lyrics from the track. It was then released on July 1, 2016 as a streaming exclusive on Apple Music, Google Play, Spotify and Tidal. "Body Say" was serviced to contemporary hit radio in the United States on July 12, 2016 through Republic Records. The song was released to iTunes on July 15, 2016.

Composition
"Body Say" is a dance ballad with an R&B beat, and explores themes of sexuality and self-confidence. Lovato co-wrote the track with Simon Wilcox and its producer Sir Nolan. The song employs "slinky", synth-y "bedroom beats" behind lyrics, which Zach Johnson of E! News deemed "sexier" than her past single, "Cool for the Summer", that discuss all the things Lovato would do to a lover if her "body had a say." Critics have also made note of the sexual nature of the song given Lovato's recent (at the time of the song's release) breakup with long-term boyfriend, Wilmer Valderrama. Lovato's vocal range on the track spans from the low note of F3 to the high note of F5.

Live performances
Lovato debuted the song on the first night of the Future Now Tour in Atlanta on June 29, 2016; it became part of a rotating setlist intended to introduce fans to her single. On September 6, 2016, she performed "Body Say" as well as her song "Confident" at the Made for History Fashion Show, a fashion fundraiser hosted by Anna Wintour for Hillary Clinton.

Credits and personnel
Credits adapted from Tidal.

Demi Lovato – lead vocals, songwriting
Sir Nolan – songwriting, production, engineering, programming
Simon Wilcox – songwriting
Tony Maserati – mixing

Charts

Certifications

Release history

References

2010s ballads
2016 singles
2016 songs
Demi Lovato songs
Hollywood Records singles
Island Records singles
Republic Records singles
Safehouse Records singles
Songs written by Demi Lovato
Songs written by Simon Wilcox
Songs written by Sir Nolan